Reiss is a surname of Old German origin, and was most commonly used by Ashkenazic Jewish people as a metonymic occupational name for a dealer in rice (Yiddish רײַז), or as an ornamental name from the Old High German word Reis ‘twig,’ ‘branch.’

Reiss (often written with the German letter ß (or sharp-s) is mostly originated in Austria and South Germany. The south German or Austrian Reiss is a leftover of a profession name Reußhäusler which could best be translated to maker of charcoal from wood in English. Members of this profession usually have been free residents (in the meaning of not enslaved and not belonging to a Duke or King) and got very early the right to carry a weapon (axe) and a uniform like dress, comparable to miners.

Another source for the name Reiss - originated mostly from the County of Hessen (Frankfurth/Main) area is a Jewish name. Some Ancestral historians write it could come from a dealer in rice or from the profession of a water gate operator, or a fish basket fisherman. At the Museum of the Judengasse (Jewish ghetto) in Frankfurt there is definitive evidence that a 'Reuse' (fish basket or creel) was one of the signs attached to Jewish homes in the streets; other signs included shields leading to names such as Rothschild. According to Dr M. Lenarz at the museum Jewish residents of the ghetto derived their legal names from the names of the house in which they were resident.

A next source is reported to be located in the former very North-Northeast Germany. It shall be originated in the Scandinavian languages (Norway/Sweden). There, the ancient Rus is the land around a river from the Baltic Sea to the heart of Russia. So the Reuss Men or Reussians are early Dark Ages Russians.
A very final and believable source is from armoured horsemen (without noble title). They are still called Reisige in German. This may come from Ross reitende, German for Horse riding Men).

The surname Reisman is a variant.

People named Reiss
 Abraham Joseph Reiss, officially the first ordained rabbi of the United States
 Albert Reiss, German operatic tenor
 Albert J. Reiss, American sociologist and criminologist
 Al Reiss,
 Allan L. Reiss,
 Andy Reiss,
 Andris Reiss,
 Anton Josef Reiss (1835–1900 ), German sculptor
 Anya Reiss, British playwright
 Archibald Reiss,
 Berit Reiss-Andersen,
 Bob Reiss, American author
 Bob Reiss (priest),
 Bobby Reiss,
 C.D. Reiss,
 Carol Shoshkes Reiss,
 Charles Reiss,
 Chen Reiss, Israeli opera singer
 Christina Reiss,
 Clotilde Reiss, French student held hostage in Iran from 2009–2010
 Dani Reiss, CEO of the Canadian company Canada Goose
 Dani Reiss,
 Daniel Reiss,
 David Reiss, British fashion retail store founder of Reiss (brand)
 David Reiss, American Social Psychologist
 Diana Reiss, American psychologist
 Dorit Rubinstein Reiss Immunization advocate
 Elayne Reiss-Weimann, Elementary school teacher and co-creator (with Rita Friedman) of The Letter People
 Elisabeth Reiss,
 Ellen Reiss, chair of the Aesthetic Realism Foundation
 Ephraim Cohen-Reiss, 20th century founder of the first Hebrew school system in Palestine and the Levant
 Eric Reiss, American author
 Ernst Reiss,
 Fraidy Reiss,
 Francis Reiss,
 Frédéric Reiss,
 Georg Reiss,
 Guy Reiss,
 Hans Reiss (1922–2020), German professor 
 Hilde Reiss,
 Ignace Reiss, alias of Soviet spy Ignace Poretsky
 Ira Reiss, American sociologist and sexuality researcher
 James Reiss, American poet
 Janine Reiss, French harpsichordist
 Johanna Reiss, Dutch-American writer and Holocaust survivor
 Jon Reiss,
 Joshua Reiss,
 Katharina Reiss, translation scholar
 Kathryn Reiss,
 Kristina Reiss (born 1952), German mathematics educator
 L. W. Reiss, former Virginia Tech college football coach
 Lionel S. Reiss, Polish-American artist, famous for his depictions of "Jewish Life"
 Louise Reiss, American physician who coordinated the "Baby Tooth Survey."
 Manfred Reiss, Polish-British artist
 Manya Reiss,
 Michael Reiss, British bioethicist, educator, and former Director of Education at the Royal Society
 Michel Reiss, German mathematician
 Mike Reiss, American television writer (The Simpsons)
 Mira Reiss, Polish-Canadian visual artist, architect
 Mitchell Reiss, American diplomat
 Morris D. Reiss, American lawyer and politician
 Paul Reiss, educator
 Phyllis Reiss,
 Piotr Reiss, Polish footballer
 Richard Reiss,
 Roland Reiss,
 Scott Reiss,
 Spencer Reiss, American journalist
 Steve Reiss, American Producer
 Steven Reiss, American Psychologist 
 Stuart A. Reiss (1921–2014), American set decorator
 Tammi Reiss,
 Thais Reiss,
 Thorleif Reiss,
 Tom Reiss, American author and journalist
 Uzzi Reiss, Israeli-American physician, pioneering gynecologist, and antiaging specialist
 Vivian Reiss, New York artist
 Wilhelm Reiss,
 William Reiss,
 Winold Reiss, German-American artist
 Yona Reiss, American rabbi and director of the Beth Din of America, the largest rabbinical court in the United States
 Zeev Reiss Israeli micropaleontologist and geologist

In fiction
 Jonathan Reiss, fictional character in the "Lara Croft" film
Historia Reiss, fictional character in the manga/anime Shingeki no Kyojin

See also
 Reisman

Occupational surnames

References

Jewish surnames
Yiddish-language surnames